Sant Gora Kumbhar (also known as Goroba) was a Hindu sant associated with the Bhakti movement and the Varkari sect of Maharashtra, India. He was a potter by trade and devotee of Vithal. Gora Kumbhar, along with other saints, wrote and sung hundreds of Abhangs.

Gora Kumbhar is traditionally believed to have lived in the village of Satyapuri, presently known as Goraba Ter in Osmanabad district of Maharashtra State. He is believed to have been a contemporary of Namdev. He is thought to have lived between  1267 and  1317 CE. A small temple named after him was built in the village and is visited by devotees.

He died on Chaitra Krishna Triodashi, Shake 1239 (April 20, 1317).

Other temples are located in Ainpur (District - Rahu (District - Pune)), Daulatabad (District - Aurangabad), Bajajnagar [(District - Aurangabad)], Turkabad Kharadi [(District - Aurangabad)], Kate Pimpalgaon (District - Aurangabad), Kokisare (District - Aurangabad). Satara), Kumbharli (District - Ratnagiri), Selu (District - Parbhani), Karjat (District - Raigad) are other Sant Goroba Kaka temples.

Life
Goraba Kaka's family tradition in the city of "Ter" was religious and virtuous. His family was worshipers of the village deity Kaleshwar at Ter. Both the bridesmaids were supporting their families by doing pottery and carpentry. Due to his virtuous and virtuous attitude, the villagers used to know Madhav Buwan as a 'saint' in 'Ter' village. Madhav buwa had eight children. Their children were not living. He had buried his 8 children in the graveyard near Kaleshwar.

How all eight children came back to life? A legend about this is told by Mahadev Balaji Kumbhar in the chaaritrya of Saint Goroba Kaka (gora kumbhar). He says in his chaaritrya, Shri Madhav buva was worshiping Kaleshwar at Ter. He had eight sons. But they all died one by one. Later, Paramatma Pandurang came to his house in the guise of a Brahmin. When they saw the sad face, the gods asked them, "Are you sad?" Madhav buwa said, "God took all our eight children, so we are sad." Then Lord Pandurang asked Madhav buwa to show the place where all eight children's were buried. Madhav Buwa took them to the cemetery near Kaleshwar, and showed them the place where he buried all the eight children. Then Lord Pandurang told Madhav Buwa to dig up the corpses of all the children. The father removed the bodies of all the eight children in the same manner. God saw and revived the seven children by the touch of His hand and sent them to heaven, and then resurrected the eighth child.

In popular culture
Several motion pictures have been produced in India, about the life and bhakthi of Gora Kumbhar:

 K. S. Gopalakrishnan directed the Telugu movie entitled Chakradhari in 1948. It starred V. Nagayya and S. Varalakshmi.
 K. S. Gopalakrishnan directed the Tamil movie entitled Chakradhari in 1948. It starred V. Nagayya and Pushpavalli.
 1974 Kannada film Bhakta Kumbara starring Rajkumar.
 V. Madhusudhana Rao directed another Telugu movie entitled Chakradhari in 1977. It starred Akkineni Nageswara Rao and was a remake of 1974 Kannada film Bhakta Kumbara.
 A Kannada film was produced in 1960s and was named as Gora Kumbara

 1967 Marathi film Gora Kumbhara, starred by Lalita Pawar and others.
 Dinesh Raval directed Gujarati film Bhagat Gora Kumbhar in 1978, starring Arvind Trivedi, Sarla Yevlekar, Kalpana Diwan, Shrikant Soni, Mahesh Joshi and others.

Notes

References

Further reading 

Indian male poets
Sant Mat gurus
Warkari
Indian potters
People from Marathwada
Poets from Maharashtra
13th-century Indian poets
14th-century Indian poets
Indian Hindu saints
1267 births
1317 deaths